Estrid Svendsdatter of Denmark (Estrith, Astrith: 990/997 – 1057/1073), was a Danish princess and titular queen, a Russian princess and, possibly, duchess of Normandy by marriage. She was the daughter of Sweyn Forkbeard and perhaps Gunhild of Wenden and half-sister of Cnut the Great.   By Ulf Jarl, she was the mother of the later King Sweyn II Estridson and Beorn Estrithson.   The dynasty that ruled Denmark in 1047–1412 was named after her.  Though never a ruler or wife of a king, she was known in Denmark as queen during her son's reign.

According to other researchers Estrid was the daughter of Sweyn Forkbeard and Sigrid the Haughty, herself the daughter of Skagul Toste, making Olof Skötkonung, the son of Sigrid the Haughty and Eric the Victorious, Estrid's half-brother while Canute the Great, Harald and Świętosława her other half-siblings, as children of Sweyn Forkbeard and the Polish princess Gunhild, daughter of Mieszko I of Poland.

Biography 

Estrid was born around 990 or around 997.    In 1014, her father died.    

She was reportedly married briefly to an unnamed Russian Prince (perhaps Vsevolod, Prince of Vladimir-Volynsk, son of Grand Prince Vladimir I the Great), who died following the Rus' war after the death of the Grand Prince in 1015. 

After her brother's elevation to the throne of England, he made an agreement with Richard II of Normandy that Estrid was to marry Richard's son Robert.   It is not known whether this marriage ever took place.   Ralph Glaber in his Historiarum libri quinque reported that an unnamed sister of Cnut married Robert, but Adam of Bremen reports a marriage of Estrid (calling her Margaret) to Richard II, indicating that after he went to Jerusalem she married Ulf, yet although Richard never went to Jerusalem, Robert did.   Norman sources do not mention such a marriage for either duke, and historians disagree whether it was a short-lived marriage, a betrothal, or a result of confusion.

Her brother Cnut then arranged a marriage for her with Ulf, Jarl of Orkney. In 1026, Ulf was killed by the order of Cnut. It is possible that the murder took place with her consent. She did not lose her brother's trust, and was granted large lands by him.  She gave her son an education by the church, made donations to the church and is believed to have founded the first church made of stone in Denmark (Roskilde Cathedral).   She supported her son's struggle to gain dominance over Denmark.   

In 1047, her son became king in Denmark due to his mother's descent, and is hence known by the matronymic Sven Estridssen ('son of Estrid').   Estrid herself was granted the honorary title of Queen (not Queen mother), the very same variation of the title normally reserved for the consort of the king, and became known as "Queen Estrid", despite the fact that she was not a monarch nor the spouse of one.  The idea that Estrid's son Sweyn Estrithson was offered the crown as the Confessor's successor is dismissed.  Ulf's sister was Gytha married to Earl Godwin, and put her family firmly in the Anglo-Scandinavian camp.  

The date of her death is unknown, but it can be no earlier than 1057 or later than 1073, as it is known that Bishop William of Roskilde officiated at her funeral, and he was in office between 1057 and 1073.

Aftermath

Estrid was widely believed to have been buried in the northeastern pier of the Roskilde Cathedral, but a DNA test in 2003 dispelled the myth as the remains belonged to a woman much too young to be Estrid.   The new theory is that the sign on the pier refers to Margareta Hasbjörnsdatter, who was also known as Estrid and who married Harald III Hen, the son of Sweyn Estridsen.

References

990s births
11th-century deaths
10th-century Danish women
11th-century Danish women
10th-century Danish people
11th-century Danish people
Estrid
Year of birth unknown
Year of death unknown
Danish princesses
Remarried royal consorts
Queens
Daughters of kings